Valérie Leclerc (born July 1, 1961) is a French sprint canoer who competed in the early 1980s. At the 1980 Summer Olympics in Moscow, she finished sixth in the K-2 500 m event.

References
Sports-Reference.com profile

1961 births
Canoeists at the 1980 Summer Olympics
French female canoeists
Living people
Olympic canoeists of France
Place of birth missing (living people)
20th-century French people